The Museum of Classical Archaeology is a museum in Cambridge, housed in the Faculty of Classics of the University of Cambridge, England. Since 1983, it has been located in a purpose-built gallery on the first floor of the Faculty of Classics on the Sidgwick Site of the university.

The museum is one of the few surviving collections of plaster casts of ancient Greek and Roman sculpture in the world. The collection consists of several hundred casts, including casts of some of the most famous surviving ancient Greek and Roman sculptures. Noteworthy casts include those of the Laocoön and His Sons, the Farnese Hercules, the Barberini Faun and Charioteer of Delphi.

The Peplos Kore is perhaps the best known exhibit in the museum. It is a plaster cast of an ancient Greek statue of a young woman  painted brightly as the original would have been, which was set up on the Acropolis of Athens, around 530 BCE. In 1975, the museum attempted to replicate the sculpture's original appearance by painting a cast of the figure. The replica was then displayed next to a second, unpainted cast as a challenge to the erroneous equation of ancient Greek sculpture with pure white marble.

The museum also holds a large collection of sherds and epigraphic squeezes.

The museum is open to the public Tuesday to Friday: 10.00am to 5.00pm and on Saturdays in University term time: 2.00pm to 5.00pm.

The museum is one of eight which make up the University of Cambridge Museums consortium.

Its former home on Little St Mary's Lane was designed by Basil Champneys in 1883. In the 1970s it became evident that it was no longer adequate to house the collection, and it is now part of the buildings of Peterhouse.

References

External links 
 Museum of Classical Archaeology website

Classical Archaeology
Institutions in the School of Arts and Humanities, University of Cambridge
Museum of Classical Archaeology
Sculpture galleries in the United Kingdom
Art museums and galleries in Cambridgeshire
Collections of classical sculpture
Museums in Cambridge
Archaeological museums in England
Museums of ancient Rome in the United Kingdom
Museums of ancient Greece in the United Kingdom
Plaster cast collections